The Roman Catholic Diocese of Araçatuba is a diocese located in the city of Araçatuba in the Ecclesiastical province of Botucatu in Brazil.

History
 March 23, 1994: Established as Diocese of Araçatuba from the Diocese of Lins

Bishops
 Bishops of Araçatuba (Latin Rite)
 José Carlos Castanho de Almeida (1994.03.23 – 2003.09.17)
 Maurício Grotto de Camargo (Apostolic Administrator 2003.09.17 – 2004.05.24)
 Sérgio Krzywy (2004.05.26 – ...)

Other priest of this diocese who became bishop
Arnaldo Carvalheiro Neto, appointed Coadjutor Bishop of Itapeva, São Paulo

Sources
 GCatholic.org
 Catholic Hierarchy

Roman Catholic dioceses in Brazil
Christian organizations established in 1994
Aracatuba, Roman Catholic Diocese of
Roman Catholic dioceses and prelatures established in the 20th century